The Chitimacha (or  ) are a federally recognized tribe of Native Americans who live in the U.S. state of Louisiana, mainly on their reservation in St. Mary Parish near Charenton on Bayou Teche. They are the only Indigenous people in the state who still control some of their original land, where they have long occupied areas of the Atchafalaya Basin, "one of the richest inland estuaries on the continent." In 2011 they numbered about 1100 people.

The people historically spoke the Chitimacha language, a language isolate. The last two native speakers died in the 1930s, but the tribe has been working to revitalize the language since the 1990s. They are using notes and recordings made by linguist Morris Swadesh around 1930. They have also started immersion classes for children and adults. In 2008 they partnered with Rosetta Stone in a two-year effort to develop software to support learning the language. Each tribal household was given a copy to support use of the language at home. The Chitimacha have used revenues from gambling to promote education and cultural preservation, founding a tribal museum and historic preservation office, and restoration of their language.

The Chitimacha are one of four federally recognized tribes in the state. The State of Louisiana does recognize several other tribes who do not have federal recognition. In the late 20th century, Louisiana had the "third-largest Native American population in the eastern United States."

History 

The Chitimacha Indians and their ancestors inhabited the Mississippi River Delta area of south central Louisiana for thousands of years before European encounter. Tradition asserts that the boundary of the territory of the Chitimacha was marked by four prominent trees. Archaeological finds suggest that the Chitimacha and their indigenous ancestors have been living in Louisiana for perhaps 6,000 years. Prior to that they migrated into the area from west of the Mississippi River. According to the Chitimacha, their name comes from the term Pantch Pinankanc, meaning "men altogether red," also meaning warrior.

The Chitimacha were divided into four sub tribes: the Chawasha, Chitimacha, Washa, and Yagenachito; these terms were what the Choctaw people called sub tribes based on the character of their geographic territories. The name Chawasha is a Choctaw term for "Raccoon Place." Washa is also Choctaw and means "Hunting Pace." Yaganechito means "Big Country."

The Chitimacha established their villages in the midst of the numerous swamps, bayous, and rivers of the Atchafalaya Basin, "one of the richest inland estuaries on the continent." They knew this area intimately. The site conditions provided them with a natural defense to enemy attack and made these villages almost impregnable. As a result, they did not fortify them. The villages were rather large, with an average of about 500 inhabitants. Dwellings were constructed from available resources. Typically the people built walls from a framework of poles and plastered them with mud or palmetto leaves. The roofs were thatched.

The Chitimacha raised a variety of crops, and agricultural produce provided the mainstay of their diet. The women tended cultivation and the crops. They were skilled horticulturalists, raising numerous, distinct varieties of corn, beans and squash. Corn was the main crop, supplemented by beans, squash and melons. The women also gathered wild foods and nuts. The men hunted for such game as deer, turkey and alligator. They also caught fish. The people stored grain crops in an elevated winter granary to supplement hunting and fishing.

Living by the waters, the Chitimacha made dugout canoes for transport. These vessels were constructed by carving out cypress logs. The largest could hold as many as forty people. To gain the stones they needed for fashioning arrowheads and tools, the people traded crops for stone with tribes to the north. They also developed such weapons as the blow gun and cane dart. They adapted fish bones to use as arrowheads.

The Chitimacha were distinctive in their custom of flattening the foreheads of their male babies. They would bind them as infants to shape their skulls. Adult men would typically wear their hair long and loose. They were skilled practitioners of the art of tattooing, often covering their face, body, arms and legs with tattooed designs. Because of the hot and humid climate, the men generally wore only a breechcloth, and the women a short skirt.

Like many Native American peoples, the Chitimacha had a matrilineal kinship system, in which property and descent passed through the female lines. The hereditary male chiefs, who governed until early in the 20th century, came from the maternal lines and were approved by female elders. Children were considered to belong to their mother's family and clan and took their status from her. Like other Native American tribes, the Chitimacha at times absorbed and acculturated other peoples. In addition, as Chitimacha women had relationships with European traders in the decades of more interaction, their mixed-race children were considered to belong to the mother's family and were acculturated as Chitimacha.

The Chitimacha were divided into a strict class system of nobles and commoners. They had such a distinction that the two classes spoke different dialects. Intermarriage between the classes was forbidden.

Colonial period to 20th century

At the time of Columbus’ arrival in America, historians estimate the combined strength of the four Chitimacha groups was about 20,000. Although the Chitimacha had virtually no direct contact with Europeans for two more centuries, they suffered Eurasian infectious diseases contracted from other natives who had traded with them, such as measles, smallpox, and typhoid fever. Like other Native Americans, the Chitimacha had no immunity to these new diseases and suffered high fatalities in epidemics.

By 1700, when the French began to colonize the Mississippi River Valley, the number of Chitimacha had been dramatically reduced. Estimates for that time are: the Chawasha had about 700 people, the Washa about 1,400; the Chitimacha some 4,000; and the Yagenichito about 3,000. (Kniffen et al. said 4,000 people in total in 1700; they may have known only about those classified only as Chitimacha.)

The sub-tribes of the Chitimacha confederation occupied a total of about 15 villages at the time of encounter with French explorers and colonists in the early 1700s. The French described the villages as self-governing groups. The Grand Chief represented the central governing authority of all the sub tribes, but they operated in a highly decentralized manner. 
 
Between the years 1706 and 1718, the Chitimacha engaged in a long, bitter war with the French. With their superior firepower, the French nearly destroyed the eastern Chitimacha. Those who survived were resettled by the French authorities, away from the Gulf of Mexico and farther north along the Mississippi River, to the area where they live today. Disease caused more deaths than did warfare and ultimately resulted in dramatic social disruption and defeat of the people. The use of alcohol also took its toll, as they were highly vulnerable to it. By 1784, the combined numbers of the tribes had fallen to 180. In the early 1800s, a small group was absorbed by the Houma of Louisiana.

In the late 18th century, the British deported the Acadians (French colonists in Acadia) from eastern Canada after defeating France in the Seven Years' War and taking over their territories in North America east of the Mississippi River. Some Acadian refugees were resettled in Louisiana along the Mississippi River; their descendants became known as Cajuns. They also put pressure on the Chitimacha population because they took over their land.

Eventually some Chitimacha married Acadians and gradually became acculturated to their community, including converting to Catholicism. Others absorbed Europeans into Chitimacha society. Mixed-race children born to Chitimacha women were considered to belong to their mother's families and generally were raised within the Indigenous culture.

The Chitimacha in the mid-19th century sued the United States for confirmation of title to their tribal land. The federal government issued a decree establishing an area of 1,062 acres in St. Mary Parish as Chitimacha land.

Among their arts, Chitimacha women weave highly refined baskets from rivercane. They maintained a strict practice of using three color: yellow, red, and black. They made baskets for sale throughout the centuries to today, as an important part of their economy. An basket maker who excelled at the double-weave technique, Ada Thomas was honored as a National Heritage Fellow by the National Endowment for the Arts in 1983.

20th century to present

The 1900 federal census recorded six Chitimacha families with a total of 55 people, three of whom were classified as full-bloods. In 1910 there were 69 Chitimacha recorded; 19 of their children were students at the Carlisle Indian School in Pennsylvania, where they boarded full time along with other Native American students from a wide variety of tribes. The Indian boarding schools were considered a means to assimilate the children into mainstream United States culture. They disrupted transmission of native languages by forcing the children to use English at school and taking them away from their families for lengthy periods of time.

The tribe was under economic pressure in the early 20th century, and sometimes members were forced to sell land because they could not afford taxes. Sarah Avery McIlhenney, a local benefactor whose family owned and operated the factory to manufacture Tabasco, responded to a call for aid by Chitimacha women. She purchased their last 260 acres of land at a sheriff's sale in 1915; then transferred it to the tribe. They ceded the land to the federal government (Department of Interior) to be held in trust as a reservation for the tribe. McIlhenny also encouraged Federal recognition of the Chitimacha as a tribe, which the Department of Interior granted in 1917.

The Chitimacha were the first tribe of indigenous people still living in Louisiana to gain federal recognition. Most Native Americans of the Southeast had been forcibly removed to Indian Territory west of the Mississippi River during the 1830s. The tribe received some annuities and financial benefits as a result of formal recognition. But the population continued its decline and by 1930, the Chitimacha had a recorded total of 51 people.

Since that early 20th-century low, the population has increased as the people have recovered. Men began to gain better employment by working in the Louisiana oil fields as drillers and foremen. In the early 21st century, the tribe reported it has more than 900 enrolled members. The 2000 census reported a resident population of 409 persons living on the Chitimacha Indian Reservation. Of these, 285 identified as solely of Native American ancestry.

This is in the Atchafalaya Basin, a rich estuary. The Chitimacha are the only indigenous people in the state who still control some of their traditional lands. As with many Native American tribes, the Chitimacha took over their children's education and have established the Chitimacha Tribal School on the reservation; it is sponsored by the Bureau of Indian Affairs.

The Tribal Council is involved in ongoing negotiations with the United States to obtain compensation for the land expropriations of the past. With revenues derived from its gaming casino, the Chitimacha have purchased additional land to be held in trust for its reservation, and now control 1000 acres. It has established a casino, school, fish processing plant, and tribal museum on its reservation.

Language

The Chitimacha language became extinct after the last two native speakers, Benjamin Paul and Delphine Ducloux, died in the 1930s. But young linguist Morris Swadesh had worked with Paul and Ducloux from 1930 to record their language and stories. He made extensive notes in an effort to save the language and its traditional accounts. Most contemporary Chitimacha speak Cajun French and English.

With revenues from gaming, the tribe has established cultural revitalization activities: a tribal historic preservation office, language immersion classes, a tribal museum, and a project to promote river cane regrowth on tribal lands to support weaving traditional baskets. In the early 1990s, the tribe was contacted by the American Philosophical Society Library, which said it held Swadesh's papers and had found extensive notes on the Chitimacha language, including a draft grammar manual and dictionary. A small team was recruited to try to learn the language quickly and begin to prepare materials to transmit it, such as a storybook. Language immersion classes were started in the school for children.

In 2008 the tribe partnered with Rosetta Stone to develop software to document the language and provide teaching materials. Each tribal household was given a copy of the software, to support families learning the language and encouraging children to speak it at home. The collaborative project is also producing a complete dictionary and learner's reference grammar for the language.

Government

The Chitimacha re-established their government under the Indian Reorganization Act of 1934, considered President Franklin D. Roosevelt's Native American New Deal. The tribe successfully resisted efforts in the 1950s to terminate them as a tribe under federal policy of the time, a move which would have ended their relationship with the federal government.

In 1971 they adopted a new written constitution. They have an elected representative government, with two-year terms for the five members of the Tribal Council. Three are elected from single-member districts and two members are elected at-large.

Membership

Like all federally recognized tribes, the Chitimacha, through passage of their constitution, have established their own rules for tribal membership. According to the constitution, they require that members have a certain blood quantum and be able to document direct descent from a member listed on one of two official rolls: 
Annuity Pay Roll of 1926, recorded by the Bureau of Indian Affairs, or 
Revised census roll of June 1959, of record at the Choctaw Indian Agency, Philadelphia, Mississippi.

In addition, a prospective member must be able to document having at least one-sixteenth (1/16) degree Chitimacha Indian ancestry (equivalent to one great-great-grandparent). Children of one-sixteenth (1/16) degree or more Chitimacha Indian blood born to any enrolled member since 1971 (when the tribe adopted their Constitution) are entitled to membership.

Representation in other media
Native Waters: A Chitimacha Recollection (2011) is a documentary directed and produced by Laudun for Louisiana Public Broadcasting. It won a 2012 Telly Award.

Notable Chitimacha people 
 Christine Navarro Paul (1874–1946), basket maker
 Ada Thomas (1924–1992), basket maker

References

Sources
 Chitimacha Reservation, Louisiana United States Census Bureau

Further reading
Duggan, Betty J. 2000. "Revisiting Peabody Museum Collections and Chitimacha Basketry Revival", Symbols (Spring):18-22.
Gregory, Hiram F. 2006. "Asá: la Koasati Cane Basketry", In The Work of Tribal Hands: Southeastern Split Cane Basketry, edited by Dayna Bowker Lee and H.F. Gregory, pp. 115–134. Northwestern State University Press, Natchitoches, Louisiana.
Gregory, Hiram F. and Clarence H. Webb. 1975. "Chitimacha Basketry", Louisiana Archaeology 2:23-38.
Hoover, Herbert T. 1975. The Chitimacha People, Indian Tribal Series, Phoenix, Arizona.
Kniffen, Fred B., Hiram F. Gregory, and George A. Stokes. 1987. The Historic Indian Tribes of Louisiana from 1542 to the Present, Louisiana State University Press, Baton Rouge.
Lee, Dana Bowker. 2006 "The Ties that Bind: Cane Basketry Traditions among the Chitimacha and Jena Band of Choctaw", In The Work of Tribal Hands: Southeastern Split Cane Basketry, edited by Dayna Bowker Lee and H.F. Gregory, pp. 43–72. Natchitoches, Louisiana: Northwestern State University Press
Usner. 2015, Daniel H. ''Weaving Alliances with Other Women: Chitimacha Indian Work in the New South, University of Georgia Press

External links
 
 
 John R. Swanton, Indian Tribes of the Lower Mississippi Valley and Adjacent Coast of the Gulf of Mexico, Smithsonian Institution, 1911, online text available

 
Native American tribes in Louisiana
American Indian reservations in Louisiana
Indigenous peoples of the Southeastern Woodlands
Federally recognized tribes in the United States